Alba Torrens Salom (born 30 August 1989) is a Spanish female basketball player at the small forward position who plays for UMMC Ekaterinburg. Winner of six EuroLeague titles with three clubs and eight medals with the Spanish senior team, she is considered one of the best European players of the 2010s. After the February 2022 Russian invasion of Ukraine, she left the Russian team UMMC Ekaterinburg.

Club career
Torrens started playing basketball in clubs in her native Balearic Islands before moving in 2003 to Segle XXI, where young talents are developed. She made her debut in the Spanish top-tier league with Celta Vigourban in the 2007–08 season. Perfumerías Avenida was her clubs for the next two seasons, winning the Spanish league and the Euroleague in 2011 under coach Lucas Mondelo. Despite being picked by the Connecticut Sun in the 2009 WNBA draft, she has repeatedly refused to join the WNBA because of the commitment to the national team.

She moved abroad in 2011 to play for Galatasaray S.K., winning one League, three Cups and her second Euroleague in 2014.

At Russian team UMMC Ekaterinburg since 2014, she won three EuroLeague Women titles in 2016, 2018, 2019 and 2021, as well as two Russian Cup and seven Russian Leagues. After the February 2022 Russian invasion of Ukraine, she left the team.

EuroLeague statistics

National team
Torrens started playing with Spain's youth teams at 14, winning a total of five medals from 2004 to 2009. She made her debut with the senior team in 2008, and went to play with the 2008 Summer Olympics when she was 18 years old. Up to 2021, she had 183 caps with 13 PPG:
  2004 FIBA Europe Under-16 Championship (youth) (MVP)
  2005 FIBA Europe Under-16 Championship (youth)
  2006 FIBA Europe Under-18 Championship (youth)
  2007 FIBA Europe Under-18 Championship (youth)
 4th 2007 FIBA Under-19 World Championship (youth)
  2009 FIBA Europe Under-20 Championship (youth) (MVP)
 5th 2008 Summer Olympics
  2009 Eurobasket
  2010 World Championship
 9th 2011 Eurobasket
  2013 Eurobasket
  2014 World Championship
  2015 Eurobasket
  2016 Summer Olympics
  2017 Eurobasket (MVP)
  2018 World Championship
 6th 2020 Summer Olympics

Individual Awards and accomplishments
FIBA Europe Young Women's Player of the Year Award: 2009
FIBA Europe Women's Player of the Year: 2011, 2014
EuroLeague Final Four MVP: 2011, 2014 
EuroBasket Women MVP: 2017
3x EuroBasket All-Tournament Team: 2013, 2015, 2017

References

External links
 
 
 
 
 
 

1989 births
Living people
Basketball players at the 2008 Summer Olympics
Basketball players at the 2016 Summer Olympics
Basketball players at the 2020 Summer Olympics
Connecticut Sun draft picks
Galatasaray S.K. (women's basketball) players
Medalists at the 2016 Summer Olympics
Olympic basketball players of Spain
Olympic medalists in basketball
Olympic silver medalists for Spain
Shooting guards
Small forwards
Spanish expatriate basketball people in Russia
Spanish expatriate basketball people in Turkey
Spanish women's basketball players
Sportspeople from Mallorca